Arbeitsdorf ("work-village") was a Nazi concentration camp in Stadt des KdF-Wagens bei Fallersleben 1942.

History and the purpose of the camp

In 1936, a Czech engineer by the name of Ferdinand Porsche designed a prototype of a car that would be affordable enough for all Germans to buy. He then showed his idea to the then dictator of Germany, Adolf Hitler. Hitler liked his idea and ordered the manufacture of the car which was known as the KDF-Wagen or later known as the Volkswagen vehicle.

In 1942, Porsche and Speer started a project to see how they could use concentration camp inmates for cheaper, and large-scale production of their cars, in order to benefit their industry. The prisoners of Arbeitsdorf were skilled workforce used for construction tasks, building a casting plant and other facilities and receiving better captivity conditions in return.

So on 8 April 1942 a new concentration camp, Arbeitsdorf, was opened with 800 inmates from the Neuengamme concentration camp. The camp commands of Neuengamme and Arbeitsdorf were united in the person of Martin Weiss, the camp commander of Neuengamme at this time. On 26 April 1942 inmates from the Sachsenhausen concentration camp and on 23 June inmates from Buchenwald arrived. Mid-July 1942 camp commander became Wilhelm Schitli, former Schutzhaft-camp commander in Neuengamme.

Closing and the death toll of the camp

On 11 October 1942, six months after the camp was first established, production of the vehicles was stopped and the camp was closed. A minimum of six prisoners perished at Arbeitsdorf. These six deaths are officially listed as suicide, heart attack or accident.

Memorial
The museum Stadtschloss Wolfsburg has a documentation about the Nazi victims with its own exhibition of the slave workers at the Volkswagen factory. (Stadtmuseum Schloss Wolfsburg, Schlossstraße 8, 38448 Wolfsburg)

See also

 List of subcamps of Neuengamme
 Glossary of Nazi Germany
 The Holocaust
 List of concentration and internment camps
 List of Nazi concentration camps
 Nazi concentration camps
 Nazi Party
 World War II

Notes

External links
US Holocaust Memorial Museum Website
Website of the camp memorial Neuengamme 

Nazi concentration camps in Germany
Subcamps of Neuengamme